Singara Chennai  is an Indian Tamil film released on 9 July 2004.

Cast
Kalabhavan Mani as Kumar
Rathi as Bhuvana
Abhinay as Surya
Vijayan as Bhuvana's father
 Muthukaalai
Kanal Kannan

Production
The film was first announced in July 2003 with Prasanna in the lead role, but ultimately went through a change of cast. In spite of the cast change, Kalabhavan Mani and Rathi remained a part of the cast.

Soundtrack 
Soundtrack was composed by Karthik Raja.

Critical reception
BBThots wrote, "Singaara Chennai is another film that falls into the same category as Image. It has a kernel of a story that, in the hands of a much better director, could possibly have been developed into an interesting film. But the movie is undermined by a disastrous screenplay that for some unknown reason, seems to rely more on an unfunny comedy track rather than the main story."

References

2004 films
2000s Tamil-language films
Indian action thriller films
2004 action thriller films
Films scored by Karthik Raja